This article lists the Human Development Index rating of each U.S. state, territory, and federal district according to the UN. It is not to be confused with the American Human Development Index. Every US State and territory is ranked Very High on the HDI.

Notes

References 

Economy of the United States-related lists
United States of America
H
Human Development Index
United States demography-related lists
United States, HDI